Thornewood is an estate in what is now Lakewood, Washington. The estate consists of three buildings, including Thornewood Castle, which was built from the brick of a dismantled 15th-century house imported from England. The Castle was used as a set for the Stephen King film Rose Red.

The property was listed on the National Register of Historic Places in 1982 and currently serves as a bed and breakfast, vacation, wedding, and event rental facility.

References

External links

 

National Register of Historic Places in Pierce County, Washington
Lakewood, Washington
Bed and breakfasts in Washington (state)
Houses completed in 1911
Houses on the National Register of Historic Places in Washington (state)
Houses in Pierce County, Washington
1911 establishments in Washington (state)